Richard Maloof (born January 17, 1940) is an American musician who played bass and tuba for the Lawrence Welk orchestra.

He was born and raised by Cy and Lucille Maloof, one of four children.  Richard graduated from San Juan High School in Citrus Heights, then attended Sacramento State University, Los Angeles City College and UCLA while searching for work as a musician. He got his first break playing for Les Brown's band and later Carmen Cavallaro before joining the U. S. Army.

While stationed at the North American Air Defense Command (NORAD), Richard played in the NORAD Commanders Jazz Band alongside future Welk musicians Johnny Zell and Dave Edwards. During his NORAD stint he got the invitation to join Lawrence Welk, both with the orchestra and on his weekly television show. That was in August 1967 and he remained until the show ended in February 1982. Starting in 1976, he had a mustache as shown on the show.

Richard has also performed music for several TV shows such as The Julie Andrews Show and Kojak as well as several commercials and feature films, and has performed on stage for the show Forever Plaid. He also served six years with the Los Angeles Pops and also teaches music sight and ear training for LA's Musicians Institute.

He married fellow Welk star Mary Lou Metzger 16 June 1973.  They reside in Sherman Oaks, California.

See also

References

1940 births
Living people
American bass guitarists
American classical tubists
American people of Lebanese descent
Musicians from Sacramento, California
Los Angeles City College alumni
University of California, Los Angeles alumni
California State University, Sacramento alumni
United States Army soldiers
Lawrence Welk
20th-century American guitarists
Guitarists from Los Angeles
21st-century tubists